Arbuzovo is a rural locality (a selo) in Aserkhovskoye Rural Settlement, Sobinsky District, Vladimir Oblast, Russia. The population was 146 as of 2010.

Geography 
Arbuzovo is located 9 km east of Sobinka (the district's administrative centre) by road. Pushnino is the nearest rural locality.

References 

Rural localities in Sobinsky District